Kurti may refer to:

People
 Kurti (king) (8th century BC), Neo-Hittite king of Atuna
 Albin Kurti (born 1975), Albanian politician leader
 Baca Kurti ( 1807–1881), Albanian nationalist leader
 Çezar Kurti (born 1935), Albanian translator
 Donat Kurti (1903–1983), Albanian Catholic cleric, scholar and folklorist
 Lec Kurti (fl. 1920s), Albanian ambassador to Greece, composer and writer
 Nicholas Kurti (1908–1998), Hungarian-born British physicist and molecular gastronomist
 Palokë Kurti (1858–1920), Albanian composer
 Shtjefën Kurti (1898–1971), Albanian Catholic cleric and martyr
 Tinka Kurti (born 1932), Albanian actress

Places
 Kurti, Iran, a village in West Azerbaijan Province, Iran
 Kurti, Sudan a town in Sudan
 Kurti, Azad Kashmir, a small village near Kotli District of Azad Kashmir, Pakistan
 Kurti, Tripura, an assembly constituency under Tripura East (Lok Sabha constituency), India

Other uses
 132798 Kürti, a minor planet
 Kurti & Doyle, a British scriptwriting team
 Kurti language, an Austronesian language spoken in Papua New Guinea
 Kurti top, upper garments worn in South Asia

See also 
Curti (disambiguation)
Kurtis (disambiguation)